Ann Saterbak is a Professor of Biomedical engineering and Engineering Design and Communication at Duke University, and is a co-author of Bioengineering Fundamentals. She formerly worked at Rice University, also as a Professor of Biomedical engineering. 

Saterbak holds a B.A. in Chemical Engineering and Biochemistry from Rice University (1990) and a Ph.D. in Chemical Engineering from the University of Illinois at Urbana-Champaign (1995).

Saterbak is a recipient of the Robert G. Quinn Award, presented by the American Society for Engineering Education.

Selected publications

 Cano, M. L., A. Saterbak, R. van Compernolle, M. P. Williams, M. E. Huot, I. A. Rhodes, C. C. Allen "A Laboratory Batch Reactor Test for Assessing Nonspeciated Volatile Organic Compound Degradation in Activated Sludge."  Water Environment Research, 75(4) (2003): 342–354.
 Volz, T. M., A. Saterbak. Students′ Strengths and Weaknesses in Evaluating Technical Arguments Revealed through Implementing Calibrated Peer Review in a Bioengineering Laboratory. Across the Disciplines, accepted for publication, 2008.

References

External links
Rice faculty page

Year of birth missing (living people)
Rice University alumni
Rice University faculty
Grainger College of Engineering alumni
Living people